The New Human Revolution is a series of novels in the roman à clef subgenre written by Japanese author Daisaku Ikeda. The series divided into 30 volumes and was published between 1995 and 2018. It is a spin-off of the twelve-volume series The Human Revolution.

Book's Overview 
The New Human Revolution begins in October 1960 with the journey of protagonist Shin-iti Yamamoto to Canada, America and Brazil, with the aim of visiting and encouraging Soka Gakkai members who were living abroad at the time. The series is also an Ikeda's tribute to all members of Soka Gakkai International. The work shares the author's belief that nuclear weapons are a threat to life and human rights at their most basic.

Furthermore, it reflects the hope that Toda's voice, who acted as Ikeda's mentor, would spread to future generations. The New Human Revolution tracks the progress of the Soka Gakkai since the death of Josei Toda in 1958 as a true tribute and account of the his personality. and efforts. To this end, Ikeda describes his own struggles and those of the pioneering members of the Soka Gakkai carried out with the aim of fulfilling Toda's wish for everyone to improve their lives and strive in the service of humanity based on the philosophy of Nichiren Buddhism. In addition, this historical novel is essentially a story about the concept of the “human revolution”, that is, the invocation of the inherent limitless power of the human being, in addition to portraying how this personal transformation can act in the construction of a movement for peace. world and individual empowerment, a dynamic process that in the Soka Gakkai is called Kosen Rufu.

Ikeda began writing The New Human Revolution, on August 6, 1993, and concluded on August 6, 2018. The dates were chosen for the symbology of being anniversaries of the Hiroshima bomber and the Universal Declaration for the Abolition of Nuclear Weapons by the then Soka Gakkai leader, Josei Toda. The New Human Revolution was serialized in the Soka Gakkai daily newspaper, the Seikyo Shimbun during this period, with the last installment published on September 8, 2018. It s a novelized account of the history and development of the Buddhist Soka Gakkai organization by the third president of the Soka Gakkai, Daisaku Ikeda. Thus, it continues the plot of The Human Revolution, which presented the story of the post-war development of the Soka Gakkai under the presidency of Josei Toda. In The New Human Revolution, the characters' names were fictitious and Ikeda appears in the work as Shin'ichi Yamamoto.

Reception 
By covering topics such as the relationship between master and disciple and everyday challenges, The New Human Revolution has become a reference for studies on the Buddhist Soka Gakkai tradition. This series of novels is considered one of Daisaku Ikeda's most famous works as a writer.

References 

Roman à clef novels
Soka Gakkai